IFK Lidingö FK is a Swedish football club located in Lidingö.

Background
IFK Lidingö is a Swedish sports club that was founded in 1932 and is based on the island of Lidingö outside Stockholm. Although the club takes part in numerous sports, it is most famous for its football, athletics and orienteering sections. The club currently has 400 members, most of them under 15 years of age.

The football section is known as IFK Lidingö FK and currently plays in Division 4 Stockholm Norra which is the sixth tier of Swedish football. They play their home matches at the Lidingövallen in Lidingö.

The club is affiliated to Stockholms Fotbollförbund.

Season to season

In their most successful period IFK Lidingö competed in the following divisions:

In recent seasons IFK Lidingö FK have competed in the following divisions:

Footnotes

External links
 IFK Lidingö FK – Official website
 IFK Lidingö FK on Facebook

Football clubs in Stockholm
1932 establishments in Sweden